Secret of the Wings (originally titled as Tinker Bell and the Mysterious Winter Woods or alternatively Tinker Bell and the Secret of the Wings) is a 2012 American computer-animated fantasy film, and the fourth installment in the Disney Fairies franchise, produced by DisneyToon Studios. It revolves around Tinker Bell, a fairy character created by J. M. Barrie in his 1904 play, Peter Pan, or The Boy Who Wouldn't Grow Up, and featured in subsequent adaptations, especially in Disney's animated works, and how she ventures to the Winter Woods and meets her twin sister, Periwinkle, who is a frost fairy. The film was directed by Peggy Holmes and co-directed by Bobs Gannaway. Starring the voices of Mae Whitman, Lucy Liu, Megan Hilty, Raven-Symoné and Angela Bartys, it also features new cast members who include Matt Lanter, Timothy Dalton, Lucy Hale and Debby Ryan, while Anjelica Huston narrates.

Plot
As the fairies make preparations for the oncoming winter, Tinker Bell helps her friend Fawn take the animals to the Winter Woods to get them ready for hibernation. Fawn warns Tink that fairies from the warmer seasons are forbidden from crossing the border to the woods as the cold can damage their wings, a law supposedly instated by Lord Milori. Out of curiosity, Tink ignores Fawn’s warnings, crosses over, and her wings start to sparkle. Before she can investigate further, Fawn pulls her back. Tink researches on sparkling wings but finds the page incomplete. Another fairy tells her the book’s author, the Keeper, lives in the Winter Woods.

Tucking her wings in a coat, Tinker Bell hides in a shipment of snowflake baskets. She gets picked up by a novice owl who crash lands in the Winter Woods, and the book falls out of her bag. The book is found by Lord Milori, who has it delivered to the Keeper. Tink secretly follows to the library and spots the Keeper, Dewey. Another winter fairy rushes into the room, and Tink notices her wings sparkling like her own. Tink and the other fairy, Periwinkle, notice each other and it is revealed that they were born from the same laugh, making them sisters.

The two spend the day together, with Peri showing Tinker Bell around the Winter Woods and introducing her to her friends, bubbly Gliss and sarcastic Spike. At Peri’s home, Tink builds a fire which eventually causes the floor to melt and crumble beneath them. Having her wings tucked inside her coat, Tink is unable to fly and nearly falls but is saved by Dewey. He advises that it is too dangerous for them to be together and the sisters pretend to say goodbye at the border but promise to meet again.

The next day, Tinker Bell arrives at the border with an ice-powered snowmaker. With the machine keeping her cool, Peri crosses over and Tink introduces her to her friends and shows her the warm side of Pixie Hollow. After a while, the machine starts running out of ice and Peri’s wings begin to wilt. Tink and her friends rush her to the border where they meet Lord Milori, who takes Peri back to the woods. Queen Clarion arrives and explains that she was the one who instated the law. Tinker Bell and Periwinkle tearfully say goodbye to each other forever. Lord Milori knocks the snow-maker into the stream under the bridge, where it gets caught by some rocks.
 
Tinker Bell and Periwinkle are told, by Queen Clarion and Lord Milori respectively, the story of two fairies who fell in love, one from the warm seasons, the other from the Winter Woods. As their romance grew, one of them crossed the border, resulting in them breaking a wing; a damage that there was no known cure for. After this, Queen Clarion declared the separation of the warm fairies from the winter fairies in order to prevent any incidents like the one from the story from happening again.

Receiving news of an emergency, Tinker Bell and the Queen fly back to the border where they find that the snow-maker has been collecting ice from the stream, generating snow continuously and causing a massive blizzard. Tink and her friends manage to free the snow-maker, but a freeze that will engulf Pixie Hollow begins to spread, and will eventually reach the Pixie Dust tree. Trying to think of what to do, Tink notices that a Periwinkle flower that Peri had covered in frost is still alive and flies to the Winter Woods. As she approaches Peri and her friends, Tink’s wings freeze and she crash lands. Peri’s friends explain that frost keeps the warm air inside like a blanket and they return to the pixie dust tree to cover it in frost. Though it seems like an impossible task for only three fairies, they are soon joined by Lord Milori who brings reinforcements, and all the winter fairies work to frost as much of the warm seasons as possible. As the freeze approaches, Lord Milori warns the warm fairies to take cover, including the Queen whom he gives his cape, revealing one of his wings is broken.

After some time, the freeze finally subsides. The Pixie Dust Tree is safe, and all the fairies celebrate. However, Tink reveals that she broke a wing when she flew to the woods earlier. As the sisters say goodbye, Tink and Peri’s wings touch and, in a flash, Tinker Bell’s wing heals. Queen Clarion and Lord Milori share a kiss, revealing themselves as the two lovers from the story. Sometime later, the warm fairies are now able to cross over into the border by having their wings frosted and the two sisters never have to be apart again.

Voice cast

 Mae Whitman as Tinker Bell, a tinker fairy and Periwinkle's twin sister.
 Lucy Hale as Periwinkle, a frost fairy and Tinker Bell's twin sister.
 Timothy Dalton as Lord Milori, leader of the Winter fairies.
 Jeff Bennett as Dewey, a frost fairy and keeper of the Winter Woods.
 Lucy Liu as Silvermist, a water fairy.
 Raven-Symone as Iridessa, a light fairy.
 Megan Hilty as Rosetta, a garden fairy.
 Pamela Adlon as Vidia, a fast-flying fairy.
 Angela Bartys as Fawn, an animal fairy.
 Debby Ryan as Spike, a frost fairy and Periwinkle's best friend.
 Grey DeLisle as Gliss, a frost fairy and Periwinkle's secondary best friend.
 Rob Paulsen as Bobble, a wispy tinker fairy with large glasses and Clank's best friend.
 Jeff Bennett as Clank, a large tinker fairy.
 Jane Horrocks as Fairy Mary, the overseer of all tinker fairies.
 Jodi Benson as Healing Fairy.
 Kari Wahlgren as Receptionist.
 Thomas Lennon as Reading Fairy.
 Ben Diskin as Slush, a Glacier Fairy.
 Kathy Najimy as The Minister of Summer.
 John DiMaggio as The Minister of Autumn.
 Steve Valentine as The Minister of Spring.
 Dee Bradley Baker as Cheese / Fiona / Blaze.
 Anjelica Huston as Queen Clarion, the queen of all Pixie Hollow.
 Matt Lanter as Sled, a frost fairy and Periwinkle's friend.

Release
The film was given a limited theatre release in the United States between August 31, 2012, and September 13, 2012. It was released on DVD and Blu-ray on October 23, 2012. It was the first film in the Disney Fairies franchise that was released in 3D. The Blu-ray, Blu-ray 3D, DVD releases also include the short film Pixie Hollow Games as a "Bonus Adventure".

The film was released theatrically in many countries and grossed $51,507,647 worldwide.

Reception 
Peter Bradshaw of The Guardian rated it 2/5 stars and called it "machine-tooled for the tweenie sleepover market".  Mark Adams of Screen Daily suggested that young children may enjoy it though they are unlikely to be impressed.

Review aggregation website Rotten Tomatoes surveyed 21 reviews of the film and found 62% of them to be positive, with an average rating of 5.4/10.

Soundtrack 

"The Great Divide" is sung by the McClain Sisters

References

External links

 
 
 

2012 films
2010s American animated films
2012 computer-animated films
2012 direct-to-video films
American animated fantasy films
2010s English-language films
Films directed by Peggy Holmes
Films set in Norway
Films set in Scotland
Tinker Bell (film series)
DisneyToon Studios animated films
Disney direct-to-video animated films
Films scored by Joel McNeely
Films about twin sisters
Films with screenplays by Peggy Holmes